This is a list of notable alumni and faculty members of the Sharif University of Technology by profession.

Academics

 Farhad Ardalan, Professor of Particle Physics, APS Fellow
 Ehsan Afshari, Professor of Electrical Engineering and Computer Science at the University of Michigan
 Mohammad-Reza Aref, Professor of the Electrical Engineering department
 Reza Ghotbi, former lecturer of Maths
 Mehdi Bahadori, Professor of Mechanical Engineering
 William Chittick, Professor of Religious Studies at the State University of New York
 Mohammed Ghanbari, Professor of Electronic Systems Engineering at the University of Essex
 Mehdi Golshani, theoretical physicist and philosopher
 Fariborz Haghighat, Professor of Building, Civil and Environmental Engineering, Concordia University
 Ali Hajimiri, Thomas G. Myers Professor of Electrical Engineering at the California Institute of Technology (Caltech)
 Payam Heydari, Professor of Electrical Engineering at the University of California, Irvine (UCI)  
 Ali Jadbabaie, Alfred Fitler Moore Professor of Electrical and Systems  Engineering at the University of Pennsylvania and MIT
 Kourosh Kalantar-zadeh, Inventor, Australian Research Council Laureate Fellow and Professor at the UNSW
 Nezam Mahdavi-Amiri, Distinguished Professor of Mathematics 
 Reza Mansouri, Professor of physics at SUT and a visiting professor at the McGill University
 Alireza Mashaghi, Scientist at Harvard University and the Leiden University
 Maryam Mirzakhani, Professor of Mathematics at the Stanford University
 Mohammad Mahdi Nayebi, Professor of Electrical Engineering at the Sharif University of Technology
 Behzad Razavi, Professor of Electronics at the UCLA
 Fazlollah Reza, former Chancellor and professor at the MIT, McGill University, and University of Tehran
 Sayed Khatiboleslam Sadrnezhaad, Professor of Metallurgical Engineering
 Ali Akbar Salehi, Professor of Mechanical Engineering
 Jawad Salehi, Professor of Mechanical and Computer Engineering
 Homayoun Seraji, former Jet Propulsion Laboratory senior researcher
 Mohammad Shahidehpour, Director of Electrical Engineering at the Illinois Institute of Technology
 Siavash Shahshahani, Professor of Mathetmatics
 Saeed Sohrabpour, current Chancellor and professor in Mechanical Engineering
 Rahmat Shoureshi, President of Portland State University
 Mitra Aliabouzar, Research Assistant Professor of University of Michigan

Business
 Alex Mehr and Shayan Zadeh, founders of Zoosk.
Behdad Esfahbod, former Senior Staff Software Engineer at Google

Government and politics

 Morteza Alviri, former Mayor of Tehran
 Mohammad Atrianfar, politician
 Majid Farahani, reformist politician
 Ali Larijani , former Speaker of the Iranian Parliament
 Mohammad-Ali Najafi, politician and advisor
 Abdul Rahman Saleem, Islamic activist
 Maryam Rajavi, president of the PMOI
 Foad Mostafa Soltani, Kurdish political leader
 Abdul Rahman Saleem, British-Iranian Islamist activist

Arts and media
 Adel Ferdosipour, prominent football commentator
 Hamid Naderi Yeganeh, mathematical artist
 Mohsen Sazegara, journalist and political activist
 Peyman Yazdanian, pianist

Sports

 Ali Daei, retired footballer with all-time highest International goalscorer record
 Elshan Moradi, chess grandmaster

Presidents
 Dr. Mohammad Ali Mojtahedi from 1965 
 Prof. Fazlollah Reza from 1968 
 Dr. Mohammad Reza Amin from 1968 
 Dr. Hossein Nasr from 1972 
 Dr. Mehdi Zarghamee from 1975 
 Dr. Alireza Mehran from 1977
 Dr. Hossein Ali Anvari from 1978 
 Dr. Ali Mohammad Ranjbar from 1979 
 Dr. Abbas Anvari from 1980 
 Dr. Ali Akbar Salehi from 1988 
 Dr. Mohammad Etemadi from 1993 
 Dr. Sayed Khatiboleslam Sadrnezhaad from 1995
 Dr. Saeed Sohrabpour from 1997
 Dr. Reza Roosta Azad from 2010
 Dr. Mahmud Fotuhi Firuzabad from 2014

References

 Sharif University of Technology - Former Presidents

See also
 Higher education in Iran
 List of University of Tehran people
 List of Iranian scholars

Peple
Sharif